Loungo Matlhaku (born 24 March 1995) is a sprinter from Botswana who competes primarily in the 200 metres. She won a bronze medal in the 4 × 400 metres relay at the 2018 Commonwealth Games. Additionally, she won several medals at regional level.

International competitions

Personal bests
Outdoor
100 metres – 11.55 (-0.5 m/s, Johannesburg 2018)
200 metres – 23.25 (+0.1 m/s, Gaborone 2016)
400 metres – 55.88 (Brisbane 2018)

References

1995 births
Living people
Botswana female sprinters
Athletes (track and field) at the 2018 Commonwealth Games
Commonwealth Games medallists in athletics
Commonwealth Games bronze medallists for Botswana
Athletes (track and field) at the 2019 African Games
African Games competitors for Botswana
Medallists at the 2018 Commonwealth Games